Belastok Voblast or Belostok Oblast (Biełastockaja vobłasć) was a short-lived territorial unit in the Belarusian Soviet Socialist Republic (BSSR) during World War II from September 1939 until Operation Barbarossa of 22 June 1941 and again for a short period in 1944. The administrative center of the newly created voblast was the  renamed Belastok.

History

Integration into the Soviet Union

From 23 September to October 1939, the secretary of the central committee of the Belarusian SSR lived in Bialystok due to the protracted procedures for the transfer of the territories west of Bialystok by German troops to Białystok.

While the leaders of provincial boards and were immediately established at the level of the Central Committee and the Military Front Council, the lower structures (poviat, gmina) were established "in consultation with the military authorities", which most often boiled down to providing these authorities with the right to choose the right people from a proven, inflowing party stream into these lands. As explained on 4 October 1939 at a meeting of the chairmen of the Provisional Boards and the secretary of the Central Committee of the Communist Party of Belarus, Panteleimon Ponomarenko, "Temporary local boards – these are the organs of military power and the war council of this or other unit that is stationed in this area, has the right to direct the activities of the temporary administration, has the right and should do so within the framework of the applicable directives of the Front War Council and the Central Committee of the Byelorussian Communist Party.

Reintegration to Belarusian SSR and disbandment
In April 1944 a special operational group was established, headed by D. K. Sukaczew, dismissed for this purpose from the oblast on 25 January 1944, which was to deal with reconstruction in triggered peripheral and district areas and municipal executive committees. Preparation also began operational groups from which activists of district committees were to be selected. Over 3,000 cadres who were selected underwent special training in Moscow and Gomel. On 18 April during the meeting of the Central Committee of the CP (b) B an action plan was approved Belostok Region for the coming months was approved. The office agreed to include a group of obek employees (operating in Moscow) together with the secretary of the Belostok Obkom Andrei P. Elman as part of the operational group of the Belarusian Headquarters of the Partisan Movement operating under the command of the 1st Belorussian Front. P. Z. Kalinin, commander of BSzRP, commander of the operational group of the staff at the 1st Belarusian Front, and Andrey Elman organized communication with underground party organs and partisan units operating in the territory of the Bialystok region and help them by providing weapons and organizing the dispatch of propaganda literature.

And so, In May 1944, after several months of absence, Sukaczew returned to BZP, already as the chairman of the Regional Executive Committee of the Council of Workers' Delegates in Bialystok. On 15 May 1944, the authorities of the Białystok underground obkom issued a decision to issue more local newspaper.

Upon the liberation of the district headquarters, the secretaries of the district of Communist Party of Byelorussia and representatives of the district executive committees were to install there. Immediately they were to start establishing local self-government and party structures. All actions were due inform the secretaries of the circuit committee without delay. The implementation of this plan from the beginning was very difficult, as many branches failed to reach the designated areas. The situation was complicated by the fact that the Red Army stopped at the end of September on the Narew – Biebrza – Augustow Canal – Czarna Hańcza rivers, which caused that part of the Augustów region and located on the left bank of the Narew, the areas of the Grajewski, Łomżyński and Ostrołęka regions remained under German control. In spite of the failures in other areas, successive ones began installing Soviet power. He informed about installation in a designated area.

On 3 July 1944, at the next meeting of the Białystok Obkom, it was decided to start publishing 4–6 times a month in Polish, with a circulation of 500 copies of the newsletter with political information. A week later, at the next meeting, a special resolution was adopted "on preparations for the entry of the Red Army and preparation of partisan units to cooperate with the city councilors". On 8 July Pyotr Ratajko was appointed the new chairman of the executive committee of the Białystok Obispolkom.
 
In the spring of 1944, meetings of the regional committee were held every two weeks, to respond to any changes on an ongoing basis. Based on the preparations, it seems nobody from Belarusian party activists at the central, and even more peripheral level, did not doubt that the Bialystok region was, is and will be inseparable part of the Belorussian SSR.

In the first days of August 1944, Soviet activists received an order to leave the Bialystok that became part of Poland and go further east, to Grodno. Despite the withdrawal of activists, the Belastok Region officially existed in the structures of the Belarusian SSR. Party activists of the in the Belostok Region they sent a letter to the secretary Panteleimon Ponomarenko of KC KP(b )B, in which they tried to persuade him that he should prevent the loss of Białystok and its surroundings, because, in their opinion, most of the inhabitants of the region were of Belorussian origin.

On 29 July 1944, the first secretary of the Bialystok Regional Committee of the Communist Party P. Elman, secretary of the Sokólki rajkom. Kolkhozes and Sovkhozes began to be restored in the Krynkowski region. Attempts to recreate Soviet power were also made in Brańsk.

Administrative units 

Belastok Voblast was created immediately following the Soviet invasion of Poland on 17 September 1939. It comprised part of the Polish areas annexed by the Soviet Union assigned by Joseph Stalin to BSSR in November 1939 (part of the modern-day West Belarus).

The Voblast consisted of 24 raions: Augustow, Bialystok, Belsky, Bryansk, Volkovysk, Grodno, Grajewo, Dombrowski, Zabludavski, Zambravski, Kolnavski, Krynkovsky, Lapski, Lomzhinsky, Monkavski (in the same year was renamed to Knyshynski), Porechsky (in the same year transferred to the Lithuanian SSR), Sakolkavski, Sapotskinsky, Skidelsky, Svislochsky, Snyadovski, Tsehanovetsky, Chyzhavski and Yadvabnavski.

According to Soviet statistical data, in the middle of 1940, the oblast had a population of 1,322,260, of whom 60.7% (802,770) were Poles, 22.7% (300,782) were Belarusians, 14.6% (193,510) were Jews, 0.63% (8,639) were Lithuanians, 0.09% (1,246) were Russians, and 1.15% (15,313) were "locals".

In the aftermath of the German attack on the Soviet Union in June 1941, this western portion of then-Belarus, which until 1939 belonged to the Polish state was placed under German Civil Administration (Zivilverwaltungsgebiet). As Bezirk Bialystok, the area was under German rule from 1941 to 1944/45, without ever formally being incorporated into the German Reich.

After the Soviet liberation of almost the whole territory of the Byelorussian SSR in July 1944, Belastok Region was disestablished on 20 September 1944 and 17 raions, together with 3 raions of the Brest Region were transferred to the Białystok Voivodeship of Poland. The remaining raions were transferred to the Grodno Region of the Byelorussian SSR. This was confirmed later by the Border Agreement between Poland and the USSR of 16 August 1945

Demographics
In the first months of the occupation, the new authorities used pre-war Polish studies. According to them, 54,907 Poles, 45,217 Jews, 6,460 Belarusians and 1,076 people of other nationalities lived in Bialystok. Similarly, in the Bialystok region: 37,577 Poles, 1,508 Jews, 8,573 Belarusians and 1,298 people of other nationalities. The data on the propaganda point of view were very unfavorable, as they undermined the basic thesis about the "Belarusian" of the seized lands. The estimates regarding the Łomża region were even more unfavorable. During the meeting of the Central Committee on 1 December 1939, Ponomarenko, speaking of Łomża, pointed out that this is a city inhabited by Poles and Jews, heavily damaged by military operations, where they are at peace with the new authorities. According to the authorities' estimates, on 1 January 1940, 18,105 Poles and 8,356 Jews lived in Łomża. The process of installing the new power ended in the first half of January 1940.

See also 

 Polish population transfers (1944–1946)
 Curzon Line

Notes

References 
 Text of 16 August 1945 Border Agreement between Poland and the USSR in the Polish language: "Umowa graniczna pomiędzy Polską a ZSRR z 16 sierpnia 1945 roku" at Wikisource.org

 
Former subdivisions of Belarus
Soviet occupation of Eastern Poland 1939–1941
Former subdivisions of Poland
History of Białystok